Aridaria is a small genus of flowering plants in the family Aizoaceae.

Like several other genera, this genus and several others were transferred into Mesembryanthemum in 2007. In 2009 this move was  reversed by other authors.

There are 4 accepted species:

Aridaria brevicarpa
Aridaria noctiflora 
Aridaria semtina
Aridaria vespertina

References

Aizoaceae
Aizoaceae genera